AFA For Effort it is the third album by the Portland, Maine alternative rock band As Fast As, released on 24 June 2009.

Track listing
"Needle In A Haystack" – 3:06
"So Good (V2)" – 3:47
"Crazy 4 U" – 2:55
"Falling Stars" – 3:46
"Jekyll and Hyde" – 3:29
"Don't Let Me Down" – 3:40
"Bigger Than Both Of Us" – 4:01
"All These Words (Ooh-Koo-Lay-Lay Version)" – 2:51
"A is Wasted" – 2:57
"I'm On Fire" – 4:06
"The Last Of The Hopeless Romantics" – 3:13
"Stay With Me (Won't You Please)" – 4:30

Personnel 

 Spencer Albee – vocals, keyboards, guitar, uke
 Haché Horchatta – bass
 Zach Jones – guitar
 Andrew "Smange" Hodgkins – Drums

2009 albums
As Fast As albums